The CAF Second Round of 2002 FIFA World Cup qualification was contested between the 25 winners from the First Round split across 5 groups.

The top country in each group at the end of the stage progressed to the 2002 FIFA World Cup.

There were 249 goals scored in 95 matches, for an average of 2.62 goals per match.

Group A

Group B

Group C

Group D

Group E

Guinea were excluded on 19 March 2001 after the Guinean sports minister had failed to meet a third FIFA deadline to reinstall the Guinean FA functionaries. Their 3 matches' results were annulled(3:0 Zimbabwe, 3:2Burkina Faso, 1:1 Malawi)

match abandoned at 0–2 at 83 minutes after crowd trouble led police to fire tear gas in the stands, causing a mass panic in which 13 people were killed. The result after 83 minutes was allowed to stand

External links
 FIFA.com Reports
 RSSSF Page

2002 FIFA World Cup qualification (CAF)
Qual
Qual